"Sleeper" is the eighth episode of the seventh and final season of the television series Buffy the Vampire Slayer.

Plot
In the opening, Spike is seen digging a grave and buries the woman he has just killed while he hums a tune. Meanwhile, Buffy struggles with the possibility that Spike may have begun killing innocent people and "siring" them as vampires. Xander asks Anya to watch Spike without tipping him off. Anya sneaks into Spike's room and starts looking for proof that he is killing again, and when he wakes up she tries unsuccessfully to seduce him in an effort to hide what she was actually doing. After Spike leaves she calls Buffy who follows him and sees him hitting on a college girl before she loses sight of them. Meanwhile, Spike takes the girl into a dark alley where an apparition appearing as Buffy encourages him to feed, which he does before running away. When the real Buffy confronts Spike later that night, he denies both killing the girl and siring Holden Webster. He claims that Buffy is the only girl that means anything to him and that he cannot kill anyone now that he has a soul. 

The Scooby Gang tries to make sense of the strange apparitions of the dead they have been contacted by and wonder whether any or all of the information they gave them was true. Spike discovers a box of cigarettes in his pocket and remembers picking up a girl at the Bronze two days ago. He knocks out Xander when he tries to prevent him leaving, claiming that he can prove that he has not been killing people, and heads to the Bronze where he tries to find out if anyone remembers seeing the girl. After killing a vampire who claims that Spike sired her, Spike calls Buffy's cell phone from a pay phone and tells her that he is remembering the bad things he has done recently and asks for her help. She agrees to meet with him at a set location. As Spike tries to leave, the duplicate of Spike shows up and tells the real Spike that calling Buffy was not part of the plan, but they will have to improvise.

Spike leads Buffy into a dark basement and tries to show her what he remembers about killing the girls. The fake Spike is there as well, but Buffy cannot see him. While the real Spike tries to show Buffy where he buried the bodies, the fake Spike starts to sing "Early One Morning". This causes Spike to vamp out and attack Buffy, cutting her arm with a piece of broken glass. As the two battle the bodies of those Spike recently killed rise from the ground beneath them as newly turned vampires. Buffy struggles with the fledglings while the fake Spike tells the real Spike to drink her blood. As two vampires hold Buffy still, Spike leans down and tastes Buffy's blood from the cut on her arm. It reawakens all of his memories of killing and he falls to the ground, horrified.

After Buffy finishes off dusting the rest of the vampires, Spike tearfully offers to be staked. He is confused, scared and hurting because of the lives he has taken. When Spike begs an invisible someone to make him forget again since Spike did what he was told, Buffy realizes something is not right with Spike and something has been messing with his head. Buffy takes Spike back to her house and tells the gang how she needs to keep him close if she intends to get answers they need.

Meanwhile, in London, a man and woman are attacked by cloaked men and Giles receives some troubling information. Giles charges into a London house and finds the dead woman and the dazed man, Robson, who warns Giles that something has started and that they need to be gathered. As Giles listens, one of the robed figures appears behind him and swings an axe at his head as the episode ends.

References

External links

2002 American television episodes
Buffy the Vampire Slayer (season 7) episodes
Television episodes set in London
Television episodes written by David Fury
Television episodes written by Jane Espenson